Dark Matter is an upcoming science fiction television series based on the novel of the same name by Blake Crouch.

Premise
A physicist in Chicago is warped into an alternate version of his life, leaving him to fight to return to his life to prevent the alternate version of himself from harming his family.

Cast

Main
 Joel Edgerton as Jason Dessen
 Jennifer Connelly as Daniela Dessen
 Alice Braga as Amanda
 Jimmi Simpson as Ryan
 Oakes Fegley as Charlie Dessen
 Dayo Okeniyi as Leighton

Recurring
 Amanda Brugel as Blaire

Production
It was first announced in December 2020 that Apple TV+ had entered into development a series adaptation of Blake Crouch's novel, with Crouch set to showrun and adapt his novel. The series was officially greenlit in March 2022, with Apple ordering 9 episodes and Joel Edgerton cast to star. Louis Leterrier was set to direct the first four episodes. By September 2022, Jennifer Connelly, Alice Braga, Jimmi Simpson, Oakes Fegley and Dayo Okeniyi joined the cast. In December, Amanda Brugel would join the cast in a recurring role.

Production began in Chicago on October 4, 2022, and is expected to wrap in April 2023.

References

External links

Apple TV+ original programming
American science fiction television series
Television series based on American novels
Upcoming television series
Television shows set in Chicago
Television series by Sony Pictures Television